Albéric Aurtenèche is a Canadian film director. He is most noted for his short film Opening Up (M'ouvrir), which won the Jutra Award for Best Live Action Short Film at the 13th Jutra Awards in 2011.

Born in Paris, France and raised in Montreal, Quebec, he studied film at Concordia University. In addition to Opening Up, he has also directed the short films Non-lieu (2006), L'appel du vide (2008), Sigismond sans images (2016) and Que votre empire s'étende (2019).

His debut feature film, La Contemplation du mystère, entered production in 2019, and was longlisted for the Directors Guild of Canada's DGC Discovery Award in 2020.

References

External links

Film directors from Montreal
Film directors from Paris
French Quebecers
French emigrants to Quebec
Concordia University alumni
Living people
Year of birth missing (living people)